The deltoid tubercle of spine of scapula is a prominence on the spine of scapula. The spine, at lateral to the root of the spine, curves down and laterally to form a lip. This lip is called the deltoid tubercle.

Muscles
Middle and inferior fibres of trapezius muscle, and deltoid muscle, attached to the deltoid tubercle. The deltoid tubercle marks the beginning of attachment of deltoid muscle.

Additional images

See also
 Acromion
 Spine of scapula

References

External links

Scapula